The Tabernacle Baptist Church, at 1431 Broad St. in Selma, Alabama, was built in 1922.  It was listed on the National Register of Historic Places in 2013.

It is a Baptist church in the National Baptist Convention, USA, and was designed by African American architect David T. West.

References

National Register of Historic Places in Dallas County, Alabama
Baptist churches in Alabama